The Charlotte Copperheads were an American professional indoor lacrosse team based in Charlotte, North Carolina. They are a charter member of the Professional Lacrosse League (PLL) and began play in the 2012 season with their home games at the Bojangles' Coliseum.

History
The Copperheads are Charlotte's second indoor lacrosse team; the Charlotte Cobras of the Major Indoor Lacrosse League (now known as the National Lacrosse League) played a single season at the Coliseum (when it was known as the Independence Arena) in 1996 before folding.  The Cobras maintain the dubious distinction of being the only EPBLL/MILL/NLL team to finish an imperfect season, going 0-10 in their only season. Charlotte has also been granted expansion in the outdoor lacrosse league (MLL) for the 2012 MLL Season, and are named the Charlotte Hounds.

The franchise was announced in 2011 as the second of five founding members in the upstart North American Lacrosse League, which hoped to start play in January 2012. On December 31, 2011, Charlotte and four of the five other teams announced the NALL had fired its acting commissioner and would move to a fall schedule. This led to a rift in the league that was settled in court, with the fall faction forming the Professional Lacrosse League.

The Copperheads began play in September 2012 with a road win against the Jacksonville Bullies. Their inaugural season concludes on December 1.
The PLL has since folded. This has caused the Copperheads to no longer exist.

Name-the-team contest
The Copperheads name was decided through a name-the-team contest-after various submissions, the official team name will be decided via a 16-nomination bracket from the top submissions.  Notably, three of the finalists (Charge, Legion, Monarchs) were runners-up for the name-the-team contest which ultimately decided the Charlotte Hounds name for the city's 2012 Major League Lacrosse team.

Bracket

Roster

Season-by-season

References

External links
Charlotte Copperheads official website

Lacrosse in Charlotte, North Carolina
Lacrosse clubs established in 2011
Lacrosse teams in North Carolina
Sports teams in Charlotte, North Carolina
2011 establishments in North Carolina
Sports clubs disestablished in 2012
2012 disestablishments in North Carolina